Matteo Adinolfi (born 24 December 1963 in Latina, Lazio) is an Italian politician currently serving as a Member of the European Parliament for the Lega Nord.

References

Living people
MEPs for Italy 2019–2024
Lega Nord MEPs
Lega Nord politicians
1963 births
Sapienza University of Rome alumni